The Montenegrin Guitar Duo is a Montenegrin duo formed in 2005. It is composed of classical guitarists Goran Krivokapić and Danijel Cerović.

In 2013 their debut CD was published by the Montenegrin Music Centre; the recording features works by Domeniconi, Piazzolla and Bogdanovic. Naxos Records released the first of two volumes of J.S. Bach’s English Suites, transcribed by the duo for two guitars, in 2015.

The Montenegrin Guitar Duo is represented by Tashmina Artists.

Discography
BACH, J.S.: English Suites Nos. 1-3 (arr. Montenegrin Guitar Duo for 2 guitars) (Montenegrin Guitar Duo)
BACH, J.S.: English Suites N os. 4-6 (arr. Montenegrin Guitar Duo for 2 guitars) (Montenegrin Guitar Duo)

References

Montenegrin musical groups
Naxos Records artists
Musical duos